Piya Rakhiya Senurwa Ke Laaj is a 1987 Bhojpuri film, directed by K. Vinod and produced by V.P Vishwakarma, starring Kunal, Bandini Mishra, Rahul Vishwakarma, Surinder Shinda, Preeti Sapru, with a special appearance by Sanjay Vishwakarma. The film was one of the highest grossing Bhojpuri films during the initial release, and won numerous awards and accolades from the public as well as critics. Piya Rakhiah Senurwa Ke Laaj emerged as the highest grossing Bhojpuri film during that period of time and is hence regarded as a cult classic "Super-Hit" Bhojpuri film.

Plot 

After completing medical studies, Vijay returns to his village and plans to set up a hospital for the poor. He meets his childhood sweetheart Basanti but her life has taken a turn for the worst. Basanti is a widow living a hard life along with her young brother. Vijay and Basanti both harbor feelings for each other but are afraid to speak about it. Basanti constantly comes under the attack of the village doctor who tries to take advantage of her. The local doctor plays vicious games to ruin Vijay and his brother Ajay, who is in love with his daughter Radha. Vijay sets out to triumph in his love but can he fight a prejudiced society plagued by illiteracy?

Music 

Usha Khanna composed the music for playback of Kartar Ramla, Manpreet Akhtar, Surinder Shinda, Sardool Sikander, Nirmal Sidhu and more. Baljinder Sangila penned the lyrics.

Track list

Piya Rakhiya Senurwa Ke Laaj
Muzzarfarpur Ke Lichiya

Cast 
 Kunal as "Vijay" 
 Rahul Vishwakarma as "Ajay"  
 Meera Madhuri as "Basanti"
 Bandini Mishra as "Bindiya"
 Sanjay Vishwakarma (special appearance)

References 

1987 films
1980s Bhojpuri-language films